Jamner Assembly constituency is one of the 288 Vidhan Sabha (Legislative Assembly) constituencies of Maharashtra state in western India. This constituency is located in the Jalgaon district.

Jamner is part of the Raver Lok Sabha constituency along with five other Vidhan Sabha segments, namely Bhusawal, Chopda, Muktainagar and Raver in Jalgaon district and Malkapur in the adjoining Buldhana district.

 1962: Abaji Nana Patil, Indian National Congress
 1967: Abaji Nana Patil, Indian National Congress
 1972: Narayan Kisan Patil, Independent
 1978: Garud Gajananrao Raghunathrao, Independent
 1980: Jain Ishwarlal Shankarlal, Indian National Congress (U)
 1985: Babusing Dagadusing Rathod, Indian National Congress
 1990: Mahajan Dattatray Ughadu, Indian National Congress
 1995: Girish Dattatray Mahajan, Bharatiya Janata Party
 1999: Girish Dattatray Mahajan, Bharatiya Janata Party
 2004: Girish Dattatray Mahajan, Bharatiya Janata Party
 2009: Girish Dattatray Mahajan, Bharatiya Janata Party
 2014: Girish Dattatray Mahajan, Bharatiya Janata Party
 2019: Girish Dattatray Mahajan, Bharatiya Janata Party

See also
 Jamner
 Jamner Municipal Council
 List of constituencies of Maharashtra Vidhan Sabha

References

Assembly constituencies of Maharashtra
Jalgaon district